John Smythe Richardson (February 29, 1828 – February 24, 1894) was a U.S. Representative from South Carolina.

Born on the Bloomhill plantation, near Sumter, South Carolina, Richardson pursued an academic course in Cokesbury, South Carolina, and was studied law at the South Carolina College (now the University of South Carolina) at Columbia, graduating in 1850. He was admitted to the bar in 1852 and began practice in Sumter, South Carolina.

During the Civil War, he entered the Confederate States Army as a captain of Infantry. He was later promoted to adjutant of the Twenty-third Regiment, South Carolina Infantry, and served until the close of the war in 1865. He served as member of the South Carolina House of Representatives in 1865–1867. He was appointed an agent of the State of South Carolina in 1866 to apply for and receive the land script donated to South Carolina by Congress. He served as delegate to the 1876 Democratic National Convention.

Richardson was elected as a Democrat to the Forty-sixth and Forty-seventh Congresses (March 4, 1879 – March 3, 1883). He served as master in equity for Sumter County in 1884–1893. He died at his country home, "Shadyside," near Sumter, South Carolina, on February 24, 1894. He was interred in Sumter Cemetery.

Sources

External links

 

1828 births
1894 deaths
Confederate States Army officers
People of South Carolina in the American Civil War
University of South Carolina alumni
People from Sumter, South Carolina
Democratic Party members of the United States House of Representatives from South Carolina
19th-century American politicians